Hosp is a surname. Notable people with the surname include:

 Nicole Hosp (born 1983), Austrian alpine skier
 Robert Hosp (1939–2021), Swiss footballer

See also
 Hopp
 HOSP